|}

The Wolferton Stakes is a Listed flat horse race in Great Britain open to horses of four-year-old and up. It is run at Ascot over a distance of 1 mile 1 furlong and 212 yards (2,004 metres), and it is scheduled to take place each year in June on the first day of the Royal Ascot meeting.

The race was first run in 2002 when Royal Ascot was extended to five days to celebrate the Golden Jubilee of Elizabeth II. It was named after the village of Wolferton near Sandringham House and initially called the Wolferton Rated Stakes. In 2018 the race was moved to the opening Tuesday of Royal Ascot and the handicap element was removed to comply with a recommendation that no handicap should carry Listed status, making it a conventional Listed Race. Group 1 and 2 winners since the previous August are prohibited from entering.

Records
Most successful horse:
 no horse has won this race more than once

Leading jockey (2 wins):
 William Buick - Beachfire (2011), Gatewood (2012)
 Daniel Tudhope -  Addeybb (2019), Dubai Future (2022) 

Leading trainer (4 wins):
* John Gosden - Beachfire (2011), Gatewood (2012), Mahsoob (2015), Monarchs Glen (2018)

Winners

Wolferton Handicap
 Weights given in stones and pounds.

Wolferton Stakes

See also
 Horse racing in Great Britain
 List of British flat horse races

References

 Racing Post:
 

Flat races in Great Britain
Ascot Racecourse
Open middle distance horse races
Recurring sporting events established in 2002
2002 establishments in England